Bouyyais a village in northern Djibouti. 

It is located in the Tadjoura Region, near the Ethiopian border. 

Populated places in Djibouti
Tadjourah Region